The European Council (informally EUCO) is a collegiate body that defines the overall political direction and priorities of the European Union. It is composed of the heads of state or government of the EU member states, the President of the European Council, and the President of the European Commission.

Established as an informal summit in 1975, the European Council was formalised as an institution in 2009 upon the commencement of the Treaty of Lisbon. Its current president is Charles Michel, former Prime Minister of Belgium.

See also 
 European Council
 European Union

Notes

References 

European Union
Europe politics-related lists